In law, damnum absque injuria (Latin for "loss or damage without injury") is the principle of tort law in which some person (natural or legal) causes damage or loss to another, but does not injure them. Examples:
 Opening a burger stand near someone else's may cause them to lose customers, but this in itself does not give rise to a cause of action for the original burger stand owner.
 Harassment of a person by physical contact may not cause injury, but may very well interfere with that person's purpose, which is a form of damage. Vehement physical contact with explicit verbal denial of permission constitutes a tort. A penal sum for damages can be applied nominally, preventing further damages to person.

Categories of damnum absque injuria

Edward Weeks identified three categories of damnum absque injuria: the absence of legal protection for some interests, the general limits to legal protection of interests, and the varying extent of legal protections of interests.

Absence of legal protection for some interests
Weeks and Oliver Wendell Holmes, Jr. identified several interests that lacked legal protection altogether.  At the time of Weeks' treatise, there was no legal protection for emotional distress unconnected to a physical injury.  Holmes also cited the example of an easement for light and air—if a neighbor built up a tall structure that overshadowed your house, you would have no legal remedy.

General limits to legal protection of interests

Weeks and Holmes also identified that there could be damage without legal remedy based on some doctrines that limited liability.  Contributory negligence, for example, could deprive a plaintiff of a legal remedy against a negligent defendant.

Varying extent of legal protections of interests

Weeks and Holmes also recognized that there could be damage without legal remedy if the damage occurred outside the scope of protection for legally recognized interests. Riparian owners, for example, could suffer damage from their neighbors upstream use of the water, but as long as the use was considered reasonable there would be no legal remedy.

Reference case 

In John Rylands and Jehu Horrocks v Thomas Fletcher (1868) House of Lords L.R. 3 H.L. 330, the judgment of Lord Cairns and Lord Cranworth stated:
 

In the 1938 decision in Alabama Power Co. v. Ickes (302 U.S. 464), the U.S. Supreme Court ruled:

References

Legal rules with Latin names